The Billboard Mainstream Rock chart is compiled from the number of airplay songs received from active rock and heritage rock radio stations in the United States. Below are the songs that have reached number one on the chart during the 2010s, listed in chronological order beginning with the first new number one of the decade, "Your Decision" by Alice in Chains. "Break" by Three Days Grace began an 11-week run at number one on December 11, 2009, and was ranked the number-one song on the Mainstream Rock chart for the year 2010 by Billboard.

2010s

 – Number-one mainstream rock song of the year

Notes

References

United States Mainstream Rock
Mainstream 2010s